Cavichona elegans is a species of ciliates in the family Spirochonidae.

References 

 Ultrastructure of the sessile ciliate Cavichona elegans (Chonotricha). I. BP Karadzhan - Non-dividing animals. (In Russian.) Acta Protozool, 1976

External links 

 Cavichona elegans at taxonomicon.taxonomy.nl

Species described in 1929
Phyllopharyngea